The Secret Intelligence Branch of the United States' Office of Strategic Services was a wartime foreign intelligence service responsible for the collection of human intelligence from a network of  field stations in Asia, Europe, and the Middle East.

The branch was established in 1942.  Its first head was David K. E. Bruce.  He was succeeded in 1943 by the business executive and international relations expert, Whitney Shepardson.

With the post-war abolition of the OSS, in October 1945, the Secret Intelligence branch became part of the Strategic Services Unit of the Department of War.  The unit was ultimately incorporated into the Central Intelligence Agency, created in 1947.

References

Office of Strategic Services
Human intelligence (information gathering)
1942 establishments in the United States
Organizations established in 1942